The 2018 Dutch Darts Masters was the sixth of thirteen PDC European Tour events on the 2018 PDC Pro Tour. The tournament took place at IJsselhallen, Zwolle, Netherlands, between 11–13 May 2018. It featured a field of 48 players and £135,000 in prize money, with £25,000 going to the winner.

Michael van Gerwen was the defending four-time consecutive champion after defeating Steve Beaton 6–2 in the 2017 final.

Van Gerwen went on to win the title for the 5th time in a row by defeating Steve Lennon 8–5 in the final, after he was 6–2 down in the semi-finals, before surviving three match darts from Daryl Gurney and winning 7–6 to reach the final.

Prize money
This is how the prize money is divided:

Prize money will count towards the PDC Order of Merit, the ProTour Order of Merit and the European Tour Order of Merit, with one exception: should a seeded player lose in the second round (last 32), their prize money will not count towards any Orders of Merit, although they still receive the full prize money payment.

Qualification and format 
The top 16 entrants from the PDC ProTour Order of Merit on 27 March will automatically qualify for the event and will be seeded in the second round.

The remaining 32 places will go to players from five qualifying events – 18 from the UK Qualifier (held in Barnsley on 6 April), eight from the West/South European Qualifier (held on 3 May), four from the Host Nation Qualifier (held on 10 May), one from the Nordic & Baltic Qualifier (held on 23 February) and one from the East European Qualifier (held on 24 February).

Rob Cross withdrew with illness on the day of the tournament, so Steve Lennon, who was due to face him in round 2, was given a bye to round 3.

The following players will take part in the tournament:

Top 16
  Michael van Gerwen (champion)
  Peter Wright (quarter-finals)
  Rob Cross (withdrew)
  Michael Smith (second round)
  Daryl Gurney (semi-finals)
  Mensur Suljović (quarter-finals)
  Joe Cullen (second round)
  Dave Chisnall (second round)
  Ian White (second round)
  Kim Huybrechts (semi-finals)
  Simon Whitlock (third round)
  Mervyn King (third round)
  Jelle Klaasen (second round)
  John Henderson (second round)
  Gerwyn Price (third round)
  Darren Webster (third round)

UK Qualifier
  Kyle Anderson (quarter-finals)
  Stephen Bunting (quarter-finals)
  Steve Beaton (second round)
  Jonny Clayton (first round)
  Adrian Lewis (first round)
  Adam Huckvale (first round)
  James Wade (first round)
  James Wilson (second round)
  Ricky Evans (first round)
  Josh Payne (second round)
  Jason Cullen (first round)
  Cameron Menzies (third round)
  Wayne Jones (second round)
  Terry Jenkins (second round)
  James Richardson (third round)
  Jamie Lewis (first round)
  Steve Lennon (runner-up)
  Ryan Joyce (second round)

West/South European Qualifier
  Michael Rosenauer (first round)
  Toni Alcinas (first round)
  Dragutin Horvat (second round)
  Cristo Reyes (second round)
  Mike De Decker (first round)
  Tobias Müller (first round)
  Rowby-John Rodriguez (first round)
  Kevin Münch (first round)

Host Nation Qualifier
  Jermaine Wattimena (third round)
  Jan Dekker (second round)
  Christian Kist (first round)
  Jeffrey de Graaf (first round)

Nordic & Baltic Qualifier
  Johan Engström (first round)

East European Qualifier
  Krzysztof Ratajski (third round)

Draw

References

2018 PDC European Tour
2018 in Dutch sport
May 2018 sports events in the Netherlands
2018 Dutch Darts Masters